The following outline is provided as an overview of and topical guide to South Korea:

South Korea – densely populated sovereign presidential republic located on the southern half of the Korean Peninsula in East Asia.  Also known as the "Land of the Morning Calm".  It is neighbored by China to the west, Japan to the east and North Korea to the north. South Korea's capital and largest city is Seoul, the world's second largest metropolitan city.

Korea has a history of 5,000 years, with its foundation dating back to 2333 BC by the legendary Dangun. Following the unification of the Three Korean Kingdoms under Silla in AD 668, Korea went through the Goryeo and Joseon Dynasty as one nation until annexed by Japan in 1910. After Japan's defeat in World War II, Korea was divided, and South Korea was established in 1948. It has since developed a successful democracy, maintaining a strong alliance with the United States.

South Korea has the fourth-largest economy in Asia. It had one of the world's fastest growing economies from the 1960s until 1980 and is now considered a developed economy. It is a G20 and OECD member. In response to tension with North Korea, it has developed the world's sixth largest armed forces and has one of the 10-largest defence budgets in the world.

South Korean industries have a strong focus on science and technology. It has an advanced infrastructure and information technology such as electronics, semiconductors, LCD displays, computers, mobile phones and automotive industry led by Chaebol, a kind of family-owned conglomerate. The economy also has a strong focus on engineering, construction, machinery, textiles, petrochemicals, biotechnology and robotics.

General reference 

 Pronunciation: 
 
 Common English country name:  South Korea
 Official English country name:  The Republic of Korea
 Common endonym(s): 한국 (韓國) (Hanguk)
 Official endonym(s): 대한민국 (大韓民國) (Daehanminguk)
 Adjectival(s): South Korean
 Demonym(s): Korean, South Korean
 Etymology: Name of South Korea
 International rankings of South Korea
 ISO country codes:  KR, KOR, 410
 ISO region codes:  See ISO 3166-2:KR
 Internet country code top-level domain:  .kr

Geography of South Korea 

Geography of South Korea
 South Korea is: a country
 Location:
 Northern Hemisphere and Eastern Hemisphere
 Eurasia
 Asia
 East Asia
 Korean Peninsula
 Time zone:  Korea Standard Time (UTC+09)
 Extreme points of South Korea
 High:  Halla-san 
 Low:  Sea of Japan and Yellow Sea 0 m
 Land boundaries:   238 km
 Coastline:  2,413 km
 Population of South Korea: 50,004,441  - 25th most populous country

 Area of South Korea: 100,032 km2
 Atlas of South Korea

Environment of South Korea 

Environment of South Korea
 Climate of South Korea
 Environmental issues in South Korea
 Renewable energy in South Korea
 Protected areas of South Korea
 National parks of South Korea
 Wildlife of South Korea
 Fauna of South Korea
 Birds of South Korea
 Mammals of South Korea

Natural geographic features of South Korea 

 Islands of South Korea
 Lakes of South Korea
 Mountains of South Korea
 Volcanoes in South Korea
 Rivers of South Korea
 Waterfalls of South Korea
 Valleys of South Korea
 List of World Heritage Sites in South Korea

Regions of South Korea 

Regions of South Korea

Ecoregions of South Korea

Administrative divisions of South Korea 

Administrative divisions of South Korea
 Provinces of South Korea

Provinces of South Korea 

Provinces of South Korea

Municipalities of South Korea 

 Capital of South Korea: Seoul
 Cities of South Korea

Demography of South Korea 

Demographics of South Korea

Government and politics of South Korea 

Politics of South Korea
 Form of government:
 Capital of South Korea: Seoul
 Elections in South Korea
 Political parties in South Korea

Branches of the government of South Korea 

Government of South Korea

Executive branch of the government of South Korea 
 Head of state: President of South Korea,
 Head of government: President of South Korea,
 Cabinet of South Korea

Legislative branch of the government of South Korea 

 Parliament of South Korea (unicameral)

Judicial branch of the government of South Korea 

 Judiciary of South Korea
 Supreme Court of Korea
 Constitutional Court of Korea

Foreign relations of South Korea 

Foreign relations of South Korea
 Diplomatic missions in South Korea
 Diplomatic missions of South Korea
 North Korea – South Korea relations

International organization membership 
The Republic of Korea is a member of:

African Development Bank Group (AfDB) (nonregional member)
Asian Development Bank (ADB)
Asia-Pacific Economic Cooperation (APEC)
Asia-Pacific Telecommunity (APT)
Association of Southeast Asian Nations (ASEAN) (dialogue partner)
Association of Southeast Asian Nations Regional Forum (ARF)
Australia Group
Bank for International Settlements (BIS)
Colombo Plan (CP)
East Asia Summit (EAS)
European Bank for Reconstruction and Development (EBRD)
Food and Agriculture Organization (FAO)
Group of Twenty Finance Ministers and Central Bank Governors (G20)
Inter-American Development Bank (IADB)
International Atomic Energy Agency (IAEA)
International Bank for Reconstruction and Development (IBRD)
International Chamber of Commerce (ICC)
International Civil Aviation Organization (ICAO)
International Criminal Court (ICCt)
International Criminal Police Organization (Interpol)
International Development Association (IDA)
International Energy Agency (IEA)
International Federation of Red Cross and Red Crescent Societies (IFRCS)
International Finance Corporation (IFC)
International Fund for Agricultural Development (IFAD)
International Hydrographic Organization (IHO)
International Labour Organization (ILO)
International Maritime Organization (IMO)
International Mobile Satellite Organization (IMSO)
International Monetary Fund (IMF)
International Olympic Committee (IOC)
International Organization for Migration (IOM)
International Organization for Standardization (ISO)
International Red Cross and Red Crescent Movement (ICRM)
International Telecommunication Union (ITU)

International Telecommunications Satellite Organization (ITSO)
International Trade Union Confederation (ITUC)
Inter-Parliamentary Union (IPU)
Latin American Integration Association (LAIA)
Multilateral Investment Guarantee Agency (MIGA)
Nuclear Energy Agency (NEA)
Nuclear Suppliers Group (NSG)
Organisation for Economic Co-operation and Development (OECD)
Organization for Security and Cooperation in Europe (OSCE) (partner)
Organisation for the Prohibition of Chemical Weapons (OPCW)
Organization of American States (OAS) (observer)
Pacific Islands Forum (PIF) (partner)
Permanent Court of Arbitration (PCA)
South Asian Association for Regional Cooperation (SAARC) (observer)
United Nations (UN)
United Nations Conference on Trade and Development (UNCTAD)
United Nations Educational, Scientific, and Cultural Organization (UNESCO)
United Nations High Commissioner for Refugees (UNHCR)
United Nations Industrial Development Organization (UNIDO)
United Nations Interim Force in Lebanon (UNIFIL)
United Nations Military Observer Group in India and Pakistan (UNMOGIP)
United Nations Mission in Liberia (UNMIL)
United Nations Mission in the Sudan (UNMIS)
United Nations Observer Mission in Georgia (UNOMIG)
Universal Postal Union (UPU)
World Confederation of Labour (WCL)
World Customs Organization (WCO)
World Federation of Trade Unions (WFTU)
World Health Organization (WHO)
World Intellectual Property Organization (WIPO)
World Meteorological Organization (WMO)
World Tourism Organization (UNWTO)
World Trade Organization (WTO)
Zangger Committee (ZC)

Law and order in South Korea 

Law of South Korea
 Cannabis in South Korea
 Capital punishment in South Korea
 Constitution of South Korea
 Crime in South Korea
 Human rights in South Korea
 LGBT rights in South Korea
 Freedom of religion in South Korea
 Law enforcement in South Korea

Military of South Korea 

Military of South Korea
 Command
 Commander-in-chief:
 Ministry of Defence of South Korea
 Forces
 Army of South Korea
 Navy of South Korea
 Air Force of South Korea
 Special forces of South Korea
 Military history of South Korea
 Military ranks of South Korea

Local government in South Korea 

 Local government in South Korea

History of South Korea 

History of South Korea
 Timeline of the history of Korea
 Current events of South Korea
 Economic history of South Korea
 Military history of South Korea

Culture of South Korea 

Culture of South Korea
 Architecture of South Korea
 Cuisine of South Korea
 Festivals in South Korea
 Languages of South Korea
 Media in South Korea
 National symbols of South Korea
 Emblem of South Korea
 Flag of South Korea
 National anthem of South Korea
 People of South Korea
 Prostitution in South Korea
 Public holidays in South Korea
 Religion in South Korea
 Buddhism in South Korea
 Christianity in South Korea
 Hinduism in South Korea
 Islam in South Korea
 World Heritage Sites in South Korea

Art in South Korea 
 Art in South Korea
 Cinema of South Korea
 Literature of South Korea
 Music of South Korea
 Television in South Korea

Sports in South Korea 

Sports in South Korea
 Football in South Korea
 South Korea at the Olympics

Economy and infrastructure of South Korea 

Economy of South Korea
 Economic rank, by nominal GDP (2015): 11th (eleventh)
 Agriculture in South Korea
 Banking in South Korea
 National Bank of South Korea
 Communications in South Korea
 Internet in South Korea
 Companies of South Korea
Currency of South Korea: Won
ISO 4217: KRW
 Economic history of South Korea
 Energy in South Korea
 South Korea Stock Exchange
 Tourism in South Korea
 Transport in South Korea
 Airports in South Korea
 Rail transport in South Korea
 Roads in South Korea

Education in South Korea 

Education in South Korea

Health in South Korea 

Health in South Korea

See also 

South Korea
Outline of Asia
Outline of geography
Outline of North Korea
President of South Korea
List of international rankings
List of South Korea-related topics
Member state of the United Nations
Member state of the Group of Twenty Finance Ministers and Central Bank Governors

References

External links 

 VISITKOREA  - The Official Korea Tourism Guide Site		
 Korea.net: Gateway to Korea
 Korea National Statistical Office
 South Korea in Encyclopædia Britannica
 South Korea. The World Factbook. Central Intelligence Agency.
 A Country Study: South Korea in the Library of Congress
 

South Korea
Outline